St. Luke's General Hospital  is a public hospital located in Kilkenny, County Kilkenny, Ireland. It is managed by Ireland East Hospital Group.

History
The hospital was opened as Kilkenny County Hospital on 18 December 1941. New facilities, including a new accident & emergency department, acute medical assessment unit, day services unit and education centre were completed in 2016.

Services
The hospital provides 285 beds, of which 228 are in-patient acute beds, while 12 are reserved for day cases.  A further 45 beds are designated for in-patient psychiatric care.

References

External links

Hospital buildings completed in 1942
1942 establishments in Ireland
Hospitals in County Kilkenny
Hospitals established in 1942
Health Service Executive hospitals